The 2022 Tour of the Alps was the 45th edition of the Tour of the Alps road cycling stage race and the sixth edition since its renaming from the Giro del Trentino. It was held from 18 to 22 April 2022 in the Austrian state of Tyrol and in the Italian provinces of Trentino and South Tyrol, which all make up the Tyrol–South Tyrol–Trentino Euroregion.

Teams 
Ten of the eighteen UCI WorldTeams, seven UCI ProTeams, and one UCI Continental team made up the eighteen teams that participated in the race.

UCI WorldTeams

 
 
 
 
 
 
 
 
 
 

UCI ProTeams

 
 
 
 
 
 
 

UCI Continental Teams

Route

Stages

Stage 1 
18 April 2022 — Cles to Primiero San Martino di Castrozza,

Stage 2 
19 April 2022 — Primiero San Martino di Castrozza to Lana,

Stage 3 
20 April 2022 — Lana to Niederdorf/Villabassa,

Stage 4 
21 April 2022 — Niederdorf/Villabassa to Kals am Großglockner,

Stage 5 
22 April 2022 — Lienz to Lienz,

Classification leadership table 

 On stage 2, Ben Zwiehoff, who was second in the mountains classification, wore the light blue jersey, because first-placed Geoffrey Bouchard wore the green jersey as the leader of the general classification.

Final classification standings

General classification

Mountains classification

Young rider classification

Sprints classification

Team classification

References

External links 
 

2022
2022 UCI Europe Tour
2022 UCI ProSeries
2022 in Italian sport
2022 in Austrian sport
April 2022 sports events in Italy
April 2022 sports events in Austria